The 1995 Mid-American Conference baseball tournament took place in May 1995. The top four regular season finishers met in the double-elimination tournament held at Warren E. Steller Field on the campus of Bowling Green State University in Bowling Green, Ohio. This was the seventh Mid-American Conference postseason tournament to determine a champion. Second seeded  won their second consecutive, and second overall, tournament championship to earn the conference's automatic bid to the 1995 NCAA Division I baseball tournament.

Seeding and format 
The top four finishers based on conference winning percentage only, participated in the tournament. The teams played double-elimination tournament. Central Michigan claimed the fourth seed over Western Michigan by tiebreaker.

Results

All-Tournament Team 
The following players were named to the All-Tournament Team.

Most Valuable Player 
Pat Mahoney won the Tournament Most Valuable Player award. Mahoney played for Central Michigan.

References 

Tournament
Mid-American Conference Baseball Tournament
Mid-American Conference baseball tournament
Mid-American Conference baseball tournament